Adeline Dumapong-Ancheta (born December 13, 1973) is a Filipina Paralympic powerlifter. She became the first Filipina to win a Paralympic medal ever when she won bronze at the 2000 Summer Paralympics.

Early life and education
Adeline Dumapong was born in Kiangan, Ifugao to a family of six children. She contracted polio when she was three years old. She spent her elementary and high school days in Bahay Mapagmahal, a housing institution for youth with disabilities and went to school at NOH School for Crippled Children inside the compound of Philippine Orthopedic Center, Quezon City.

She has a degree in computer secretarial from St. Paul University Quezon City.

Career
Dumapong took up powerlifting in 1997 due to the encouragement of his male friends since she has a stocky build. She then went on to train at the Philippine Orthopedic Center in Banawe, Quezon City.

The International Paralympic Committee took notice of Dumapong when the Philippine Orthopedic Center's rehab department sent Dumapong's powerlifting record. Since then, she has won in tournaments outside the Philippines. She was also offered free training under Coach Ramon Debuque of the Zest Power Gym.

She competed at the 2000 Summer Paralympics in Sydney, Australia and competed at the women's −82.5 kg powerlifting event. She managed to win a bronze medal and became the first Paralympic representative of the Philippines to win a medal up until the 2016 Paralympics. She has also represented the country in the FESPIC Games, the precursor tournament of the Asian Para Games, where she won silver in the 1999 and 2000 editions. Her silver medal in the 2002 games was won in the −82.5 kg powerlifting event by lifting 105 kg.

Outside of competing, Dumapong has also joined Philippine Paralympic Committee President Mike Barredo in Congressional hearings to advocate for incentives and pay for para-athletes to be matched to their abled-bodied counterparts.
 
Dumapong also competed at the 2014 Asian Para Games at the +86 kg event. She won a silver medal registering 115 kg. Her South Korean opponent, Lee Hyun-Jung registered the same mark but won gold due to weighing 100.08 kg, lighter than Dumapong's 111.80 kg.

Personal life
After the 2000 Paralympics, Dumapong played and worked with a rondalla, an ensemble of stringed instruments composed of musically-inclined youth with disabilities. She also assists the Philippine Sports Association of the Differently Abled in various events. Dumapong gave birth to Alyssa Mei in May 2002, her first child and daughter.

External links
Adeline Dumapong - Website
Adeline Dumapong at PWD Files (Vera Files)

References

1973 births
Living people
Filipino female weightlifters
Powerlifters at the 2000 Summer Paralympics
Powerlifters at the 2004 Summer Paralympics
Powerlifters at the 2008 Summer Paralympics
Powerlifters at the 2012 Summer Paralympics
Medalists at the 2000 Summer Paralympics
Paralympic bronze medalists for the Philippines
People from Ifugao
ASEAN ParaGames competitors
Female powerlifters
Paralympic powerlifters of the Philippines
Paralympic medalists in powerlifting
FESPIC Games competitors